Lake Acworth is a   artificial lake southwest of the city of Acworth, Georgia. It is in the extreme northwestern part of Cobb County. The lake impounds Proctor Creek (not the same as Proctor Creek in nearby Atlanta), and outflows into Lake Allatoona.  The low dam is at the point where State Route 92 (Lake Acworth Drive) crosses.

The city operates Acworth Beach, a public beach and park along the lake's northern shore. It was created by trucking white sand in and putting it over the rust-red clay soil common to the region. Swimming is roped off with floats for protection from the boaters. The Lake Acworth Beach and Beachhouse were added to the National Register of Historic Places in 2010.

References

External links

Protected areas of Cobb County, Georgia
Acworth
Bodies of water of Cobb County, Georgia